Mose Frazier  (born August 30, 1993) is a former American football wide receiver. He played college football at Memphis.

Professional career

Denver Broncos
Frazier signed with the Denver Broncos as an undrafted free agent on May 3, 2016. He was waived on September 3, 2016, and was signed to the practice squad the next day. He was released on October 18, 2016.

Buffalo Bills
On October 25, 2016, Frazier was signed to the Buffalo Bills' practice squad. He was released by the team on November 4, 2016.

San Francisco 49ers
On November 8, 2016, Frazier was signed to the San Francisco 49ers' practice squad.

Carolina Panthers
On January 17, 2017, Frazier signed a reserve/future contract with the Carolina Panthers. He was waived on September 2, 2017, and was signed to the Panthers' practice squad the next day. He was promoted to the active roster on December 22, 2017.

On September 1, 2018, Frazier was waived by the Panthers and was signed to the practice squad the next day. He was promoted to the active roster on December 5, 2018.

On June 4, 2019, Frazier was waived/injured by the Panthers after suffering a broken arm in OTAs. He was released on June 12, 2019.

References

External links
Memphis Tigers bio

1993 births
Living people
American football wide receivers
Memphis Tigers football players
Denver Broncos players
Buffalo Bills players
San Francisco 49ers players
Carolina Panthers players
Players of American football from Memphis, Tennessee
Arkansas–Pine Bluff Golden Lions football players